Peaky Blinders is a British period crime drama television series created by Steven Knight. Set in Birmingham, England, it follows the exploits of the Peaky Blinders crime gang in the direct aftermath of the First World War. The fictional gang is loosely based on a real urban youth gang of the same name who were active in the city from the 1880s to the 1910s.

It features an ensemble cast led by Cillian Murphy, starring as Tommy Shelby, Helen McCrory as Elizabeth "Polly" Gray, Paul Anderson as Arthur Shelby, Sophie Rundle as Ada Shelby, and Joe Cole as John Shelby, the gang's senior members. Sam Neill, Annabelle Wallis, Iddo Goldberg, Tom Hardy, Charlotte Riley, Finn Cole, Natasha O'Keeffe, Paddy Considine, Adrien Brody, Aidan Gillen, Anya Taylor-Joy, Sam Claflin, Amber Anderson, James Frecheville, and Stephen Graham are also starring. It premiered on 12 September 2013, telecast on BBC Two until the fourth series (with repeats on BBC Four), then moved to BBC One for the fifth and sixth series.

Netflix, under a deal with Weinstein Company and Endemol, acquired the rights to release the show in the United States and around the world. In January 2021, it was announced that the sixth series would be the last, followed by a spinoff film. The final series was broadcast in 2022.

Overview

Peaky Blinders is a crime drama centred on a family of mixed Irish Traveller and Romani origins based in Birmingham, England, starting in 1919, several months after the end of the First World War. It centres on the Peaky Blinders street gang and their ambitious, cunning crime boss Tommy Shelby (Murphy). The gang comes to the attention of Major Chester Campbell (Neill), a detective chief inspector in the Royal Irish Constabulary sent over by Winston Churchill from Belfast, where he had been sent to clean up the city of the Irish Republican Army flying columns, the Communist Party of Great Britain, street gangs, and common criminals. Winston Churchill (played by Andy Nyman in series 1 and Richard McCabe in series 2) charges him with suppressing disorder and uprising in Birmingham and recovering a stolen cache of arms meant to be shipped to Libya. The first series concludes on 3 December 1919—"Black Star Day", the event where the Peaky Blinders plan to take over Billy Kimber's betting pitches at the Worcester Races.

The second series has the Peaky Blinders expand their criminal organisation in the "South and North while maintaining a stronghold in their Birmingham heartland". It begins in 1921 and ends with a climax at Epsom racecourse on 31 May 1922, Derby Day.

The third series takes place in 1924, following Tommy and the gang as they enter an even more dangerous world by expanding once again, this time internationally. The third series also features Father John Hughes (Paddy Considine), who is involved in an anti-communist organisation; Ruben Oliver (Alexander Siddig), a painter whom Polly enlists to paint her portrait; Russian Grand Duchess Tatiana Petrovna (Gaite Jansen); and Linda Shelby (Kate Phillips), new wife of Arthur.

The fourth series begins on Christmas Eve 1925, with the Peaky Blinders getting word that the New York Mafia, led by Luca Changretta (Adrien Brody), is coming to avenge the murders committed the previous season and ends following the general strike of May 1926, with Tommy using Jessie Eden for information and being elected as a Member of Parliament in 1927.

The fifth series runs two years later, from (Black Tuesday), 29 October 1929, to 7 December 1929, the morning after a rally led by British Union of Fascists leader Sir Oswald Mosley.

The sixth series begins on 5 December 1933, as prohibition is repealed in the United States. The Nazi Party has obtained power in Germany, leading to a growth in membership of the British Union of Fascists. Tommy must not only deal with Mosley but also with plots from the Irish Mob as well as the Anti-Treaty IRA.

Cast and characters

Main
 Cillian Murphy as Thomas "Tommy" Shelby, the leader of the Peaky Blinders.
 Sam Neill as Chief Inspector/Major Chester Campbell (series 1–2), an Ulster Protestant policeman drafted from Belfast.
 Helen McCrory as Elizabeth Pollyanna "Polly" Gray (series 1–5), née Shelby, the aunt of the Shelby siblings, and treasurer of the Peaky Blinders.
 Paul Anderson as Arthur Shelby Jr., Tommy's best friend and eldest of the Shelby siblings.
 Annabelle Wallis as Grace Shelby (series 1–3, 5), née Burgess, a former undercover agent, and Irish Protestant. She is Tommy's first wife and mother of his son Charles.
 Iddo Goldberg as Freddie Thorne (series 1), a known communist who fought in the Great War and Ada's husband.
 Sophie Rundle as Ada Thorne, née Shelby, the only sister of the Shelby brothers.
 Joe Cole as John "Johnny" Shelby (series 1–4), the third-youngest Shelby brother and a member of the Peaky Blinders.
 Ned Dennehy as Charlie Strong, owner of a boatyard and an uncle figure to the Shelby siblings.
 Benjamin Zephaniah as Jeremiah 'Jimmy' Jesus, a preacher, and friend of the Peaky Blinders.
 David Dawson as Roberts (series 1), Billy Kimber's accountant.
 Andy Nyman (series 1), Richard McCabe (recurring series 2), and Neil Maskell (series 5–6) as Winston Churchill
 Charlie Creed-Miles as Billy Kimber (series 1), a local kingpin and leader of The Birmingham Boys who runs the local races.
 Tommy Flanagan as Arthur Shelby, Sr. (series 1), the father of the Shelby siblings and Polly's brother.
 Noah Taylor as Darby Sabini (series 2), the leader of an Italian gang in Camden Town.
 Tom Hardy as Alfred "Alfie" Solomons (series 2–6), the leader of a Jewish gang in Camden Town.
 Charlotte Riley as May Fitz Carleton (series 2, 4), a wealthy widow who owns racehorses.
 Finn Cole as Michael Gray (series 2–6), Polly's biological son.
 Natasha O'Keeffe as Elizabeth "Lizzie" Shelby, née Stark (series 2–6; guest series 1), an ex-prostitute who worked for Tommy as his secretary. She is his second wife and the mother of his daughter Ruby.
 Aimee-Ffion Edwards as Esme Shelby-Lee (series 3–4, 6; recurring series 1–2), John's wife and a member of the Lee clan.
 Gaite Jansen as Princess Tatiana Petrovna (series 3), a Russian princess who has an affair with Tommy.
 Alexander Siddig as Ruben Oliver (series 3), a portrait artist in a romantic relationship with Polly.
 Packy Lee as Johnny Dogs (series 3–6; recurring series 1-2), Tommy's Gypsy friend.
 Jan Bijvoet as Arch Duke Leon Romanov (series 3), Tatiana's uncle. 
 Dina Korzun as Grand Duchess Izabella Petrovna (series 3), Tatiana's aunt.
 Paddy Considine as Father John Hughes (series 3), a priest working with the anti-communist Section D (the Economic League) in the British government
 Kate Phillips as Linda Shelby (series 4–6; recurring series 3), Arthur's wife who is a devout Christian.
 Charlie Murphy as Jessie Eden (series 4–5), a union convenor and Tommy's lover.
 Adrien Brody as Luca Changretta (series 4), a New York mafioso with a vendetta against the Peaky Blinders.
 Ian Peck as Curly (series 4–6; recurring series 1–3), a horse expert and Charlie's assistant.
 Jack Rowan as Bonnie Gold (series 4–5), Aberama's boxing champion son.
 Aidan Gillen as Aberama Gold (series 4–5), an ally of the Peaky Blinders and Polly's lover.
 Anya Taylor-Joy as Gina Gray (series 5–6), Michael's American wife.
 Kingsley Ben-Adir as Colonel Ben Younger (series 5; guest series 4), a young colonel who begins a relationship with Ada. He is also investigating socialist and fascist political activities.
 Sam Claflin as Sir Oswald Mosley (series 5–6), a fascist politician and leader of the British Union of Fascists.
 Brian Gleeson as Jimmy McCavern (series 5), the leader of the Billy Boys, a Scottish Protestant gang.
 Kate Dickie as Mother Superior (series 5), the head of a group of nuns.
 Andrew Koji as Brilliant Chang (series 5), a Chinese criminal leader involved in opium smuggling.
 Cosmo Jarvis as Barney Thomason (series 5), a WWI sniper who was Tommy's comrade and old friend and is locked in an insane asylum.
 Alfie Evans-Meese (recurring series 1) and Harry Kirton (series 6; recurring series 2–5) as Finn Shelby, the youngest Shelby brother and a member of the Peaky Blinders.
 Charlene McKenna as Laura McKee/ Captain Swing (series 6; guest series 5), an IRA leader from Belfast.
 Pauline Turner as Frances (series 6; recurring series 4–5), Tommy's housekeeper.
 Amber Anderson as Lady Diana Mitford (series 6), Mosley's second wife, one of the aristocratic Mitford sisters and a Fascist socialite.
 James Frecheville as Jack Nelson (series 6), a south Boston gang leader, Gina's uncle and Michael's boss in the United States. Nelson is based on Joseph Kennedy, Sr.

 Stephen Graham as Hayden Stagg (series 6), the union convenor for the workers at Liverpool docks.
 Conrad Khan as Erasmus "Duke" Shelby (series 6), Tommy's first-born son from before the Great War.
 Jordan Bolger (recurring series 2–4) and Daryl McCormack (series 6; recurring series 5) as Isiah Jesus, Jeremiah's son and a member of the Peaky Blinders.
 Emmett J. Scanlan as Billy Grade (series 6; recurring series 5), an ex-footballer turned singer and an ally to the Peaky Blinders.

Recurring
 Lobo Chan as Mr. Zhang (series 1), a business owner in Chinatown.
 Neil Bell (series 1) as Harry Fenton, a former landlord and owner of the Garrison pub.
 Samuel Edward-Cook as Danny "Whizz-Bang" Owen (series 1), Tommy's former comrade and a loyal member of the Peaky Blinders.
 Tony Pitts as Sergeant/Inspector Moss (series 1–4), a police officer from Birmingham.
 Kevin Metcalfe as Scudboat (series 1–2), a henchman of the Peaky Blinders.
 Jeffrey Postlethwaite as Henry (series 1–2), a Peaky Blinders henchman. 
 Matthew Postlethwaite as Nipper (series 1–2), a Peaky Blinders henchman.
 Simone Kirby as Irene O'Donnell (series 2), a Pro-Treaty IRA member, who works with Donal Henry and Inspector Campbell to blackmail Tommy into carrying out an assassination.
 Rory Keenan as Donal Henry (series 2), a spy who worked for the Irregulars against the Pro-Treaty IRA.
 Adam El Hagar as Ollie (series 2), Alfie's assistant.
 Sam Hazeldine as Georgie Sewell (series 2), the right-hand man and consiglieri to Sabini.
 Wanda Opalinska as Rosemary Johnson (series 2, 4), Michael's foster mother, whom she named Henry.
 Daniel Fearn as King Maine (series 2, 4), a boxing trainer in Birmingham who trains Arthur and Bonnie.
 Paul Bullion as Billy Kitchen (series 2), a Black Countryman, who briefly worked as a Head Baker for Tommy and Alfie.
 Josh O'Connor as James (series 2), Ada's friend and housemate.
 Dorian Lough as Mario (series 2), the owner of The Eden Club, ran by Sabini.
 Allan Hopwood as Abbey Heath (series 2)
 James Eeles as "The Digbeth Kid" Harold Hancox (series 2), an aspiring actor hired by the Peaky Blinders to get stood up and spend a week inside jail, only to be killed by Sabini's henchmen.
 Erin Shanagher as Mrs. Ross (series 2, 4), a vengeful mother who dislikes Arthur for the death of her son.
 George Gwyther (series 3) and Callum Booth-Ford (series 5–6) as Karl Thorne, the only child of Ada and Freddie.
 Stephanie Hyam as Charlotte Murray (series 3), a wealthy girl, with whom Michael has a short affair.
 Kenneth Colley as Vicente Changretta (series 3), the father to Changretta and his brother Angel.
 Bríd Brennan as Audrey Changretta (series 3–4), Changretta's mother, wife of Vicente Changretta and head of the Italian crime family in Birmingham, as part of being the enemy of the Peaky Blinders.
 Frances Tomelty as Bethany Boswell (series 3), a wise old woman living in Wales, whom Tommy seeks out.
 Richard Brake as Anton Kaledin (series 3), a Russian refugee, who attempted to discuss business with Sabini and Tommy on Tommy and Grace's wedding day.
 Alex Macqueen as Patrick Jarvis MP (series 3), a Member of Parliament and also a member and representative of the Economic League, working with Father Hughes
 Ralph Ineson as Connor Nutley (series 3), a Lancaster factory foreman.
 Peter Bankole as William Letso (series 3), a former diamond miner, a tunneler from the South African Labor Corps and Tommy's friend.
 Richard Dillane as General Curran (series 3), Grace's uncle.
 Dominic Coleman as Priest (series 3)
 Wendy Nottingham as Mary (series 3), Tommy's housekeeper.
 Billy Marwood (series 3), Jenson Clarke (series 4–5), and Billy Jenkins (series 6) as Charles Shelby, the son of Tommy and Grace.
 Luca Matteo Zizzari as Matteo (series 4), one of Changretta's henchmen.
 Jake J. Meniani as Frederico (series 4), one of Changretta's henchmen.
 Graeme Hawley as Niall Devlin (series 4), a working man in the Peaky Blinders Limited, working for Tommy.
 Donald Sumpter as Arthur Bigge (series 4), the King's Private Secretary, who deals with the case of the execution of Polly, Arthur, John and Michael.
 Jamie Kenna as Billy Mills (series 4), a former heavyweight boxing champion and a worker for the Shelby Company Limited, who fights against Bonnie at the company.
 Joseph Long as Chef (series 4)
 Andreas Muñoz as Antonio (series 4), the Italian assassin who came into Tommy's house as a sous-chef and planned to kill Tommy.
 Ethan Picard-Edwards as Billy Shelby (series 4), the son of Arthur and Linda.
 Dave Simon as Mulchay (series 4–5)
 Heaven-Leigh Clee (series 5) and Orla McDonagh (series 6) as Ruby Shelby, the daughter of Tommy and Lizzie.
 Elliot Cowan as Michael Levitt (series 5), a Birmingham journalist.
 Peter Campion as Micky Gibbs (series 5), barman of The Garrison pub.
 Tim Woodward as Lord Suckerby (series 5), a High Court Judge.
 Darragh O'Toole as Liam (series 6), an associate of Jack Nelson's. 
 Peter Coonan as Connor Dunn (series 6), an associate of Jack Nelson's.
 Assaad Bouab as Henri (series 6), a bartender on Miquelon Island. 
 Franc Bruneau as Miquelon Island Police Commissioner (series 6), Head of Police Department on Miquelon Island.
 Simon Wan as Han (series 6), An opium dealer who operates through a cafe in Birmingham's Chinatown. 
 Naomi Yang as Li (series 6), Han's wife. 
 Aneurin Barnard as Doctor Holford (series 6), Tommy's personal doctor.
 Abbie Hern as Mary Bone (series 6), Finn's wife.

Episodes

Production
Peaky Blinders was created by Steven Knight and produced by Katie Swinden. Screen Yorkshire provided funding for the production through the Yorkshire Content Fund, ensuring that the majority of the show was filmed in Yorkshire as part of the deal. Linguists weren't hired in the production to assist in the show, leading to the Romani Gypsies in the earlier series frequently speaking broken Romanian (as opposed to Romani).

Series 1 
The first series was filmed in Birmingham, Bradford, Dudley, Leeds, Liverpool, and Port Sunlight. Railway sequences were filmed between Keighley and Damems, using carriages from the Ingrow Museum of Rail Travel (owned by Vintage Carriages Trust), and carriages owned by the Lancashire and Yorkshire Railway Trust. Many of the scenes for the show were filmed at the Black Country Living Museum. Steven Knight, Stephen Russell and Toby Finlay all had writing credits on the series.

Ulster-born, New Zealand-raised Sam Neill enlisted the help of Northern Irish actors James Nesbitt and Liam Neeson to help him recover his lost Northern Irish accent for the role of C.I. Campbell. In the end, he had to tone down the accent since the series was marketed in the United States.

Series 2
A second series was commissioned shortly after the broadcast of the first and aired in October and November 2014. On 11 January 2014, auditions were held in Digbeth area of Birmingham (near where parts of the series are set) for white and mixed race teenage male extras, resulting in lengthy queues.

Series 3
Shortly after the final episode of the second series, the show announced via its Twitter account that it had been renewed for a third series. On 5 October 2015, the official Peaky Blinders Twitter account announced that filming had begun for series 3. Filming completed on 22 January 2016, after 78 days of shooting.

Series 4
During the initial broadcast of series 3, the BBC renewed Peaky Blinders for series 4 and 5, each of which comprises six episodes. Filming for series 4 started in March 2017 and premiered on 15 November 2017 on BBC Two. Both The Weinstein Company and its logo in its credits weren't included, even though the company was formerly involved in the US distribution of the series.

Series 5
The BBC commissioned a fifth series in mid-2016. On 22 August 2018, it was confirmed that series 5 would be broadcast on BBC One. Having already premiered to a select audience at Birmingham Town Hall on 18 July 2019, the series began airing on BBC One on 25 August 2019.

Series 6
On 5 May 2018, Steven Knight told Birmingham Press Club that "we are definitely doing [series] six". Production on the series was due to begin in March 2020, but was delayed due to the COVID-19 pandemic. During 2020, rumours emerged linking comedian Rowan Atkinson to the show for the role of Adolf Hitler in series 6, but the producers denied the involvement saying that the news is "completely false".

On 18 January 2021, it was announced that series six, which had just begun filming, would be the final television series of Peaky Blinders; though Knight revealed "the story will continue in another form". Helen McCrory, who played the character of Polly Gray, died in April 2021 and had been unable to film any scenes for the series. Series six premiered on 27 February 2022.

Future

Following the announcement that the sixth series would be the last, Knight clarified that, following the year-long production hiatus in 2020, it had been decided to produce a feature length movie in place of a seventh television series, with other connected television series potentially following. There is still no production date, but creator Steven Knight has revealed that the movie should be in cinema in 2024.

Peaky Blinders won the Returning Drama award at the 2022 National Television Awards ceremony, with Knight subsequently confirming during his acceptance speech that production of the film would begin in Spring 2023.

Reception
The show received widespread critical acclaim. David Renshaw of The Guardian summarised the series as a "riveting, fast-paced tale of post-first world war Birmingham gangsters", praising Murphy as the "ever-so-cool Tommy Shelby" and the rest of the cast for their "powerful performances". Sarah Compton of The Telegraph gave the series a 4/5 rating, praising the show for its originality and "taking all of our expectations and confounding them". Alex Fletcher from Digital Spy believes that "Peaky Blinders has started as sharp as a dart", while Den of Geek called the series "the most intelligent, stylish and engrossing BBC drama in ages". Cult TV Times critic Hugh David said the show "warrants the billing" by "managing to tick several ratings boxes – period drama, gangster epic, film star leads – yet go against the grain of those in the most interesting of ways".

The show has been particularly celebrated for its stylish cinematography and charismatic performances, as well as for casting an eye over a part of England and English history rarely explored on television. Historians have been divided over whether bringing characters and events from other decades into a 1920s story undermines claims to historical accuracy, or whether working-class life in the period is nevertheless depicted in a truthful and resonant way. Reviews for the second series have remained positive, with Ellen E. Jones of The Independent commenting that "Peaky Blinders can now boast several more big-name actors to supplement the sterling work of Cillian Murphy, Helen McCrory and Sam Neill", referring to second series additions Tom Hardy and Noah Taylor.

Several critics have compared the show favourably to the American series Boardwalk Empire, which shares the same themes and historical context. Show writer Steven Knight stated in an early interview: "Do you know – and I'm not just saying this – but I've never watched them. I've never seen The Wire, I've never seen Boardwalk Empire, I've never seen any of them." When asked if he deliberately avoided watching these dramas, he responded: "It's sort of deliberate in that I don't really want to be looking at other people's work because it does affect what you do inevitably." On 2 March 2016, Knight told the Crime Scene Quarterly "I've had unsolicited communication from Michael Mann, the film director, from Dennis Lehane, Snoop Dogg – he's such a fan. And the late David Bowie was a huge fan – more of that to come" (strongly hinting Bowie's involvement on series 3). It was later confirmed that David Bowie's music would be featured, and Leonard Cohen had also written a new song for series 3.

The sixth and final series has received universal acclaim. On Metacritic, it has a weighted average score of 86 out of 100 based on 7 reviews, indicating "universal acclaim". On Rotten Tomatoes, it holds a 93% approval rating based on 14 reviews, with an average critic rating of 8/10. The website's critical consensus reads, "Peaky Blinders''' sixth season gracefully addresses the untimely passing of star Helen McCrory while setting the stage for a fitting climax to this epic saga of likable scalawags."

 Depiction of Jessie Eden 
Series four and five introduced the character Jessie Eden, based on the real-life British communist and trade union leader. Although the reception was mixed, some people who had known Jessie Eden personally took offence to the way she was depicted. Graham Stevenson, a historian of British communism, a personal friend of Jessie Eden and the writer of her biography, was a harsh critic of the show, stating:

Stevenson also criticised the show for its clothing choices, incorrectly showing Churchill as Home Secretary in 1919, incorrectly depicting Eden as a mass leader during the 1926 General Strike; eventually these inaccuracies led Stevenson to stop watching the show. He went on to elaborate: "Although the TV series' cinematography, music and fast-paced action is obviously attractive, especially matched to outstanding charismatic performances, it's disappointing that an expert in Tudor history was the historical adviser to the series, rather than someone with a background in trade unionism or communism."

At a round table event featuring Stevenson, the poet Dave Puller, and cultural historian Paul Long, the three discussed the series and its depictions of the British working class. Long rated the series positively and praised the series as a great representation of interesting working-class protagonists. Puller had mixed feelings and was disappointed that the show chose to focus on Jessie Eden's fictional romance with Tommy, rather than her real achievements as a communist and a trade union leader.

Awards and nominations

Broadcast and release
On 24 September 2014, it was announced that Netflix had acquired exclusive US distribution rights from the Weinstein Company and Endemol. The entirety of series 1 became available for streaming on 30 September 2014; series 2 launched in November 2014. Series 3 was made available 31 May 2016. Due to licensing restrictions, however, most of the show's original soundtrack is not available on the Netflix-distributed version of the series. In 2018, it was announced Peaky Blinders would be moved from its original broadcast channel, BBC Two, to BBC One for its fifth and sixth series.

Cultural impact
According to the Office for National Statistics (ONS), Peaky Blinders has had a detectable cultural impact in the UK. In 2018, the name Arthur surged into the top 10 boys names for the first time since the 1920s, and Ada jumped into the girls' top 100 for the first time in a century too. The assumption reached by the ONS is that the popularity of these names was inspired by the characters Arthur Shelby Jr. and Ada Thorne.

Video games
In August 2020, a video game based on the television series, titled Peaky Blinders: Mastermind, was developed by FuturLab and released for Xbox One, PlayStation 4, Nintendo Switch, and for PC via Steam. A virtual reality game, Peaky Blinders: The King's Ransom'', was developed by Maze Theory and released for Meta Quest 2 and PICO 4 on March 9, 2023.

References

Bibliography

External links
 
 
 
 

2013 British television series debuts
2022 British television series endings
BBC crime drama television shows
2010s British crime drama television series
2020s British crime drama television series
Cultural depictions of Winston Churchill
Cultural depictions of Oswald Mosley
English-language television shows
Gangs in fiction
Serial drama television series
Television series by Endemol
Television series by Tiger Aspect Productions
Television series set in the 1910s
Television series set in the 1920s
Television series set in 1919
Television series set in 1924
Television series set in 1929
Television shows set in Birmingham, West Midlands
Television series about organized crime
Television series about families
Television series created by Steven Knight
Television productions suspended due to the COVID-19 pandemic
Television series set in 1933
BAFTA winners (television series)